Etnesjøen or Etne is the administrative centre of Etne municipality in Vestland county, Norway.

The village is located along the river Etneelva in a large river valley surrounded by mountains and a fjord. There are three historic churches in the greater Etnesjøen area:  Gjerde Church, Grindheim Church, and Stødle Church.

References

Villages in Vestland
Etne